Buenvenida is a variation of the Spanish word bienvenida, feminine form of bienvenido, which literally means "welcome." According to the Catálogo alfabético de apellidos, a document of surnames published in the Philippines and other islands of Spanish East Indies in the mid-19th century, the name has also been adopted by locals in the Philippines. This was in response to a Spanish colonial decree establishing the distribution of Spanish family names among the inhabitants of the Philippines who did not already have a surname.

Spanish Governor General Narciso Clavería y Zaldúa issued a decree on November 21, 1849. Following the Christianization of the Philippines, many Filipinos chose surnames. The surname is very common in the Province of Capiz, in the Island of Panay. The town of  "Pan-ay," from which the island derives its name, was the second Spanish settlement in the Philippines when conquistador Miguel Lopez de Legaspi left Cebu for Manila. He settled in the banks of the Pan-ay river and built a pueblo. Following Christianization, surnames of the local inhabitants were changed to Spanish surnames. Intermarriage between the Spaniards and locals brought for a new class of local mestizos, thus the Buenvenida family is as old as the town itself. In fact, several notable members of the clan became an alcalde of the pueblo, and many with the Buenvenida surname still live in the old town.

References 

Clavería y Zaldúa, Narciso (1849, 1973). Catálogo alfabético de apellidos (reprint). Philippine National Archives, Manila.

Spanish-language surnames